Lwakhakha may refer to the following:

Lwakhakha, Uganda, the Ugandan town on the border with Kenya.

Lwakhakha, Kenya, the Kenyan town on the border with Uganda